"Bad Habits" is a song by English singer-songwriter Ed Sheeran. It was released on 25 June 2021, through Asylum and Atlantic Records, as the lead single of his fourth studio album, =. The song marked his first solo release from an album in over four years. A limited edition CD and cassette single were also released. The song received mixed reviews from music critics, who compared its sound and style to the works of the Weeknd, as well as Bronski Beat.

"Bad Habits" was a commercial success, peaking at number one in 28 countries including Australia, Belgium, Canada,  Germany, Hungary, New Zealand, Switzerland and South Africa, becoming the official first number-one hit on the newly launched South African music charts. The song proved to be particularly successful in both the United Kingdom and Ireland, as it spent eleven consecutive weeks at the top of both the UK Singles Chart and Irish Singles Chart and also became the best-selling single of the year in both countries. In the United States, the song peaked at number two on the Billboard Hot 100. The song also topped the Global 200.

A UK drill remix made by Fumez the Engineer featuring British rappers Tion Wayne and Central Cee was released on 12 August 2021. Following his performance with Bring Me the Horizon at the 2022 BRIT Awards, the pair announced they were releasing a heavy metal studio version of the track on 17 February 2022. This version of the song was later featured on the Tour deluxe edition of =.

Background 
A slower acoustic song was planned to be released as the lead single from Sheeran's upcoming fifth studio album =. However, when the easing of COVID-19 pandemic restrictions were announced in England in early 2021, Sheeran chose to record "Bad Habits" and release it instead; "I don't know if the world needs a depressing sad, slow acoustic song when [the country is] opening up ", Sheeran said. He wrote the song in January 2021 to "surprise people" and "make something that was totally different" to what is expected of him.

Release 
On 23 April 2021, Sheeran was spotted dressed as a zombie or vampire on a music video set in London, leading to speculations about upcoming music. Sheeran himself confirmed the pictures to be genuine by posting outtakes of the video shoot on his social media pages in June 2021. On 25 May, he uploaded a picture of himself sitting next to a giant Snorlax pillow, with a caption on the picture above him saying "6/25", hinting at a release on that date. On 4 June, he began teasing the single release on his social media accounts, as well as announcing a performance at TikTok's UEFA Euro 2020 show with David Beckham on 25 June. Sheeran announced the single on 11 June. A promotional image of the single cover appeared on the Tate Modern in London.

Composition and reception 

"Bad Habits" is a dance-pop and synth-pop track.

"Bad Habits" was met with mixed reviews from critics. Alexis Petridis of The Guardian gave the song four out of five stars, describing it as "a certain smash that's ready for the Weeknd". Nick Levine of NME gave the track three out of five stars, calling it "neither a misfire nor a surefire winner," and compared the sound style to Bronski Beat works, especially "Smalltown Boy". The Independents Adam White was less impressed, giving "the stilted comeback" two out of five stars and saying Sheeran was "letting the toplines do the work and rummaging through Abel Tesfaye's leftovers." Quinn Moreland of Pitchfork derided the song as "painfully predictable", writing that it "aspires for Abel but settles for anonymity".

Accolades

Commercial performance
In the United States, "Bad Habits" debuted at number five on the Billboard Hot 100, with 38.8 million airplay audience impressions, 17.7 million streams and 33,200 copies sold. It opened at number two on Digital Song Sales and number six on Streaming Songs, and surged 36–11 on Radio Songs. The song became Sheeran's eighth top 10 in the US and first since 2019. On the chart dated 28 August 2021, the song reached a new peak at number two behind "Stay" by the Kid Laroi and Justin Bieber. The song ranked at number one on the Top Triller US Chart dated to 10 July 2021. The chart highlights the biggest songs on Triller based on a formula blending the amount of views of videos containing a respective songs, the level of engagement with those videos and the raw total of videos uploaded featuring each song.

Music video

The music video for "Bad Habits" was directed by Dave Meyers and filmed at the Catford Centre in Catford, South East London. It was uploaded on 25 June 2021, onto YouTube where it has over 480 million views as of February 2023. The music video portrays Sheeran as a vampire in a hot pink suit. The video starts in a beauty salon with Sheeran as a vampire, withering a flower before flying across chaos-ridden streets. He joins with several other monsters in doing various activities amidst the panicking crowd, including attacking them for the fun of it and handing out a balloon to a monster child, until the sun begins to rise. Most of the monsters go into hiding, with a few vaporized by the sunlight, except for Sheeran, who transforms back into his normal human self, playing the guitar as the video ends. The black cat in the video is a reference to the Catford Cat at the entrance to the shopping Centre. The video concept received comparisons to Michael Jackson's Thriller.

Sheeran said he wanted the video to "play on the nature of habits in a fantastical way so I decided on vampires." It was inspired by the song's lyrics and American television series Buffy the Vampire Slayer. Madison Bloom of Pitchfork described Sheeran as "the worst monster in the history of pop music", pointing out that the video "constantly suggests the potential for violence and gore but never commits."

Live performances
Sheeran gave his first live performance of "Bad Habits" on 28 June 2021, on The Late Late Show with James Corden. On 30 June, Sheeran performed the song on The One Show. Sheeran performed the song on GMA Network's All-Out Sundays on 15 August.

Track listing

Digital download, streaming and CD single
"Bad Habits" – 3:51

Digital download and streaming – Acoustic Version
"Bad Habits" (Acoustic Version) – 3:52

Digital download and streaming – MEDUZA Remix
"Bad Habits" (MEDUZA Remix) – 3:14

Digital download and streaming – Joel Corry Remix
"Bad Habits" (Joel Corry Remix) – 3:09

Digital download and streaming – The Remixes
"Bad Habits" (Jubël Remode) – 2:59
"Bad Habits" (Kooldrink Amapiano Remix) – 5:27
"Bad Habits" (SHAUN Remix) – 3:44
"Bad Habits" (Ovy on the Drums Remix) – 3:30

Digital download and streaming – Fumez the Engineer Remix
"Bad Habits" (Fumez the Engineer Remix featuring Tion Wayne and Central Cee) – 3:42

Cassette single
"Bad Habits" – 3:51
"Bad Habits" (Acoustic Version) – 3:52

Credits and personnel
Credits adapted from Tidal.
 Ed Sheeran – vocals, songwriting, production, acoustic guitar, percussion
 Fred Gibson – songwriting, production, backing vocals, bass, drums, guitar, keyboards, piano, programming, engineering
 Johnny McDaid – songwriting, production, acoustic guitar, engineering
 Graham Archer – vocal production, engineering
 Iain Archer – slide guitar
 Will Reynolds – engineering assistance
 Mark "Spike" Stent – mixing
 Matt Wolach – mixing assistance
 Stuart Hawkes – mastering

Charts

Weekly charts

Year-end charts

Certifications

Release history

Bring Me the Horizon remix 

On 14 February 2022, following the performance, a studio version of the track was announced, set for release on 17 February. The remix was included on the tour version of =.

Live performance
At the 2022 Brit Awards, Sheeran performed "Bad Habits" with Bring Me the Horizon. They'd perform the song together again at Reading Festival later that same year.

Commercial performance 
After its first full tracking week, on Billboard charts dated to 5 March 2022, the remix debuted on three charts, on Hot Alternative Songs at number 17, Hot Rock & Alternative Songs at number 19,  becoming Ed Sheeran's first charting song on the chart since Blow, and Hot Hard Rock Songs at number 2, behind "The Rumbling" by SiM, marking Sheeran's first appearance on the chart and Bring Me the Horizon's twelfth.

Reception 
The Editor in Chief of MetalSucks, Emperor Rhombus, called the performance at the BRIT Awards an attempt to combine metal with pop, but said that it came off sounding like an Imagine Dragons song.

Track listing 
Digital download and streaming
"Bad Habits" (featuring Bring Me the Horizon) – 4:10

Charts

Weekly charts

Year-end charts

Footnotes

See also
List of Billboard Adult Contemporary number ones of 2021

References

External links
 
  
 
 
 
 
 

2021 singles
2021 songs
Ed Sheeran songs
Bring Me the Horizon songs
Animated music videos
Asylum Records singles
Atlantic Records singles
Billboard Global 200 number-one singles
Billboard Global Excl. U.S. number-one singles
British dance-pop songs
Canadian Hot 100 number-one singles
Dutch Top 40 number-one singles
Irish Singles Chart number-one singles
Music videos directed by Dave Meyers (director)
Number-one singles in Australia
Number-one singles in Austria
Number-one singles in the Commonwealth of Independent States
Number-one singles in Denmark
Number-one singles in Finland
Number-one singles in Germany
Number-one singles in New Zealand
Number-one singles in Norway
Number-one singles in Poland
Number-one singles in Portugal
Number-one singles in Romania
Number-one singles in Russia
Number-one singles in Switzerland
Songs about parties
Song recordings produced by Ed Sheeran
Songs written by Ed Sheeran
Songs written by Fred Again
Songs written by Johnny McDaid
UK Singles Chart number-one singles
Ultratop 50 Singles (Flanders) number-one singles
Ultratop 50 Singles (Wallonia) number-one singles
British synth-pop songs